The uniform antshrike (Thamnophilus unicolor) is a species of bird in the family Thamnophilidae. It is found in Colombia, Ecuador, and Peru. Its natural habitat is subtropical or tropical moist montane forests.

The uniform antshrike was described by the English zoologist Philip Sclater in 1859 and given the binomial name Dysithamnus unicolor.

References

uniform antshrike
Birds of the Colombian Andes
Birds of the Ecuadorian Andes
Birds of the Peruvian Andes
uniform antshrike
uniform antshrike
Taxonomy articles created by Polbot